Thylacoptila borbonica is a species of moth of the family Pyralidae. It is found on La Réunion.

References

Moths described in 2007
Phycitini
Endemic fauna of Réunion
Moths of Réunion